Elta 2052 is an X-Band airborne active electronically scanned array fire control radar (FCR) designed for air-to-air superiority and strike missions. It is Based on full solid-state Active Electronically Scanning Array (AESA) technology for fighter aircraft. Currently, it has been fitted in the SEPECAT Jaguar as part of Indian Air Force (IAF) DARIN III upgrade program. The radars are also been fitted in HAL Tejas, and described as suitable for use in the F-15, MiG-29, Mirage 2000 and FA-50 Block 20.

The FCR is based on fully solid-state active phased array technology. The radar has multi-target tracking capability of up to 64 targets. The EL/M-2052 radar incorporates operational feedback from Israeli Air Force combat pilots.

The radar introduces improvements to the air-to-air, air-to-ground and air-to-sea operation modes of the aircraft. In the air-to-air mode, the radar enables long-range multi-target detection and enables several simultaneous weapon deliveries in combat engagements.

In air-to-ground missions, the radar provides very high resolution mapping (SAR), surface moving target detection and tracking over RBM, DBS and SAR maps in addition to A/G ranging. In Air-to-Sea missions the radar provides long-range target detection and tracking, including target classification capabilities (RS, ISAR).

Controversy
A Chinese company based in Beijing called NAV Technologies has marketed a radar similar to the Elta 2052. It is said to have caused an investigation in Washington for a connection between Israel and Beijing but Elta has denied.

References

Aircraft radars
Military radars of Israel
Elta products